The Two Tigers (Italian: Le due tigri) is a 1941 Italian historical adventure film directed by Giorgio Simonelli and starring Massimo Girotti, Luigi Pavese and Sandro Ruffini. It is based on the 1904 novel The Two Tigers by Emilio Salgari, featuring the character of Sandokan. It was made back-to-back with another Sandokan adventure Pirates of Malaya.

It was shot at the Cinecittà Studios in Rome. The film's sets were designed by the art director Alfredo Montori.

Cast
 Massimo Girotti as Tremal-Naik 
 Luigi Pavese as Sandokan 
 Sandro Ruffini as Yanez de Gomera 
 Alanova as Surama 
 Cesare Fantoni as Sujodana 
 Enzo Gerio as Aghur 
 Giovanni Onorato as Sambigliong 
 Arturo Bragaglia as Il taverniere 
 Amedeo Trilli as Sirdar 
 Bruno Smith as Il caporale della ronda 
 Agnese Dubbini as La moglie di Sambigliong 
 Delia Lancelotti as La piccola Darma
 Virgilio Tomassini as Il manti 
 Totò Majorana as Un sergente Inglese

References

Bibliography 
 Goble, Alan. The Complete Index to Literary Sources in Film. Walter de Gruyter, 1999.

External links 
 

1941 films
Italian historical adventure films
1940s historical adventure films
1940s Italian-language films
Films directed by Giorgio Simonelli
Italian black-and-white films
Films shot at Cinecittà Studios
Films set in the 19th century
Films based on the Indo-Malaysian cycle
1940s Italian films